White-throated bearded greenbul may refer to:

 Eastern bearded greenbul, a species of bird found in central Africa 
 White-throated bulbul, a species of bird found in south-eastern Asia